Gregory Joseph O'Halloran (born May 21, 1968) is a Canadian former professional baseball catcher.

O'Halloran attended a high school in Mississauga, Ontario which did not field a baseball team; he instead played baseball in competitive summer leagues. As a child, he thought of baseball simply as "something I did in the summer when I wasn't playing hockey."

O'Halloran played college baseball at Orange Coast College in California and accepted a scholarship to continue his college baseball career at Illinois. In advance of the 1988 Major League Baseball draft, he told all interested teams, except for his childhood favorites, the Toronto Blue Jays, that he intended to play at Illinois even if drafted. With their pick in the 32nd round, the Blue Jays selected and signed O'Halloran.

In 1988, he played for the Canada national baseball team at the Baseball World Cup and Summer Olympics.

In November 1993, following the inaugural season of the Florida Marlins, the Blue Jays sold O'Halloran's contract to the Marlins. At the time, he was the fourth player on their catching depth chart behind Pat Borders, Randy Knorr and Carlos Delgado.

He played for the Marlins for 12 games during the 1994 season, serving mostly as a pinch hitter.

References

External links
, or Pelota Binaria (Venezuelan Winter League)

1968 births
Living people
Baseball players from Toronto
Canadian baseball coaches
Canadian expatriate baseball players in the United States
Cardenales de Lara players
Canadian expatriate baseball players in Venezuela
Duluth-Superior Dukes players
Dunedin Blue Jays players
Florida Marlins players
Canadian baseball players
Canadian sportspeople of Irish descent
Knoxville Blue Jays players
Langosteros de Quintana Roo players
Major League Baseball catchers
Major League Baseball players from Canada
Orange Coast Pirates baseball players
Portland Sea Dogs players
St. Catharines Blue Jays players
Canadian expatriate baseball players in Mexico
Baseball players at the 1988 Summer Olympics
Olympic baseball players of Canada